The Bo'ai Special Zone is a restricted zone in Zhongzheng District, Taipei, Taiwan which was established to protect the Presidential Office Building. As part of the historical center of Taipei, the zone also houses several critical government office buildings as well as historic sites.

Introduction 
The Bo'ai special zone is located in the historical center of Taipei. Taipei is the capital of Taiwan since late 19th century. Modern constructions started in the 1910s in Japanese era when the new office of the Governor-General of Taiwan was built here. Plenty of buildings belong to agencies under the Government-General of Taiwan were also built around the office and made here the central place of Taiwanese government since then. In late 1949, the Government of the Republic of China relocated to Taipei and moved into the governmental buildings formerly used by the Japanese administration. The President of the Republic was settled in the building which used to house the Governor-General of Taiwan and renamed it the Presidential Office Building.

The zone was claimed jointly by the Ministry of National Defense and Ministry of the Interior according to the National Security Act to protect the head of state and commander-in-chief. The zone covers of the surrounding area of the Presidential Office Building within distance between 200 and 500 meters. Buildings built within this area are subject to height limit of 24 meters, with some extra requirements of window sizes. The area is also designed as a prohibited airspace.

Governmental Buildings also recognized as National Monuments

Other government agencies 
 Academia Historia (Taipei municipal monument, formerly the Communications Bureau of Government-General of Taiwan)
 Armed Forces Reserve Command of Ministry of National Defense (Taipei municipal monument, formerly the Taiwan Army of Japan Headquarter)
 Central Weather Bureau
 Ministry of Justice
 National Development Council
 Supreme Administrative Court
 Supreme Court
 Supreme Prosecutors Office
 Taiwan High Court
 Taiwan High Prosecutors Office
 Taiwan Taipei District Court

Other historical sites 
 Bank of Taiwan Head Office (Taipei municipal monument)
 Chunghwa Telecom Bo'ai Service Center (Taipei municipal monument, formerly the Telephone exchange office of Government-General of Taiwan)
 National Taiwan Museum (National monuments, formerly the Museum of Government-General of Taiwan)
 Natural History Branch of National Taiwan Museum (Taipei municipal monument, formerly Nippon Kangyo Bank Taihoku Branch)
 Taipei First Girls' High School (Taipei municipal monument, formerly Taihoku First Girls' High School)

Other locations 
Schools:
 Chinese Culture University Yanping Extension Education Center
 Soochow University Downtown Campus
 Taipei First Girls' High School (formerly Taihoku First Girls' High School)
 University of Taipei Bo'ai Campus (formerly Taihoku Normal School of Government-General of Taiwan)
Parks:
 228 Peace Memorial Park (formerly Taihoku New Park)
 Jieshou Park

See also 
 Exclusion zone
 Military exclusion zone
 Prohibited airspace
 Kasumigaseki
 Washington, D.C.
 Zhongnanhai

References 

Geography of Taipei